Noel Reif Chambers (14 July 1923 – 22 November 1990) was a New Zealand swimmer who won a gold medal for his country at the 1950 British Empire Games.

Chambers won five New Zealand national swimming titles: the 220 yards freestyle in 1946 and 1948; the 440 yards freestyle in 1946 and 1948; and the 880 yards freestyle in 1946.

At the 1950 British Empire Games in Auckland, he won a gold medal as part of the New Zealand men's 4 x 220 yards freestyle relay team, alongside Lyall Barry, Buddy Lucas, and Michael Amos. He also competed in the 440 yards freestyle, finishing fourth in his heat with a time of 5:14.1, and did not progress to the final as the tenth fastest swimmer overall.

See also
 List of Commonwealth Games medallists in swimming (men)

References

External links
 Photograph of the 1950 Empire Games 4 x 220 yards freestyle relay team from New Zealand

1923 births
1990 deaths
Commonwealth Games gold medallists for New Zealand
New Zealand male freestyle swimmers
Swimmers at the 1950 British Empire Games
Commonwealth Games medallists in swimming
20th-century New Zealand people
Medallists at the 1950 British Empire Games